Dibernardia persimilis is a species of snake in the family Colubridae. The species is native to Brazil.

References

Dibernardia
Snakes of South America
Reptiles described in 1869
Endemic fauna of Brazil
Reptiles of Brazil
Taxa named by Edward Drinker Cope